Down and Out in the Magic Kingdom is a 2003 science fiction book, the first novel by Canadian author and digital-rights activist Cory Doctorow. Concurrent with its publication by Tor Books, Doctorow released the entire text of the novel under a Creative Commons noncommercial license on his website, allowing the whole text of the book to be freely read and distributed without needing any further permission from him or his publisher.

The novel was nominated for the Nebula Award for Best Novel in 2004.

Plot summary
This future history book takes place in the 22nd century, mostly in Walt Disney World. Disney World is run by rival adhocracies, each dedicated to providing the best experience to the park's visitors and competing for the Whuffie the guests offer.
 
The story is told in first person by Julius, whose old college buddy Dan used to be one of the most popular people in the country (as measured by Whuffie).  Julius and girlfriend Lil are working with the committee (called an ad hoc) that oversees the Magic Kingdom's Liberty Square. Dan, who has hit rock bottom and lost all his Whuffie, doesn't believe in rejuvenation and wishes to die, but not while he's at rock bottom. He moves in with Julius and Lil in order to rebuild his life. At the park, Julius is murdered and soon refreshed. By the time he wakes up, Debra's ad hoc group has taken control of the Hall of Presidents, and is planning to replace its old-fashioned animatronic robots with the synthetic memory imprinting of the experience of being the president for a moment. Julius believes that this rival committee had him killed as a distraction so that they could seize the Hall in the interim.

Fearing that they will next try to revamp his favorite ride, the Haunted Mansion, he resolves to take a stand against the virtualization of the park, endangering his relationship with both Lil and Dan; eventually Lil leaves Julius for Dan. Julius finally "cracks" when he sees his dreams turned to dust and he bashes up the attractions in the Hall of Presidents, in the process also damaging his own cranial interface to the point that he can no longer back himself up. This pushes his Whuffie to ground level when he is caught and gives Debra and her colleagues enough "sympathy Whuffie" to take over the Haunted Mansion, by invitation of the same fans that Julius had recruited to work in the Mansion.

Dan leaves Lil, Julius is kicked out of the ad hoc and his Whuffie hits rock bottom — low enough that others take his possessions with impunity and elevators don't stop for him. Then comes the revelation: a few days before Dan's planned suicide by lethal injection, Dan reveals that it was in fact he who had arranged to kill Julius, in collusion with Debra, in exchange for the Whuffie that her team could give him. Dan had asked one of his converts from his missionary days, a young girl, to do the dirty work.  Debra then had herself restored from a backup made before this plan, so that she would honestly believe that she wasn't involved. He makes this public; Debra is thrown out, Julius gets sympathy Whuffie and develops a friendly affection for his sweet young murderer. He never restores himself, because doing so would erase his memories of that entire year, his last with Dan, but lives with his damaged interface. The book is his attempt to manually document the happenings of the previous year so that, when this incarnation is eventually killed by age or accident, his restored backup will have a partial record of the transpiring events.  Dan decides not to take a lethal injection, but to deadhead (putting oneself into a voluntary coma) till the heat death of the Universe.

Characters
Julius (also known as Jules), the narrator of the book, is more than a century old. His childhood dream is living at Disney World (also known as "The Magic Kingdom").
Lil, age 23, with long red hair and freckles, is Jules' girlfriend. She is 15 percent of Jules' age, but outwardly the same age. She was raised in Walt Disney World.
Dan is Jules' best male friend. He is a former missionary for the Bitchun utopia who has lost the will to live now that there are no technophobes left to convert.
Debra is one of the old guard of Disney World and was a comrade of Lil's parents before they went deadhead. She spent a decade in Disneyland Beijing, coding sim-rides.
Tim is a programmer of synthetic memories.
Tom and Rita are Lil's parents who were "members of the original ad hoc that had seized power in Walt Disney World, wresting control from a gang of wealthy former shareholders who had been operating it as their private preserve".
Zed (also known as Zoya)  is a transhuman who was married to Julius for 18 months, went crazy, and reverted to a backup from before she met Julius.

Cultural cross references
 Chapter five includes a description of a "Snow Crash Spectacular parade" based on Neal Stephenson's book Snow Crash.  
 The book contains references to the Beatles song "Rocky Raccoon". Julius' girlfriend leaves him for his friend Dan, just as Lil leaves Rocky Raccoon for a man named Dan in the song. At the beginning of the book, Jules and Lil sing some lyrics from the song.
"Rangy Lil" is a character from the science fiction classic "Time Enough for Love" by Robert Heinlein.  The character Dan in this book says: "Lil, you are one rangy cowgirl."
 Doctorow's short story "Truncat" is also set in the Bitchun Society, sometime after the events of Down and Out.
 Doctorow's short story "I, Row Boat", a play on words of Isaac Asimov's I, Robot, also appears to be set in the same universe (though more distantly future), with references to artificial uploading and downloading of intelligence, but no explicit mention of the Bitchun Society or Whuffie.
 The title is a reference to George Orwell's Down and Out in Paris and London.

Licensing
On February 12, 2004, Doctorow re-licensed his book under a Creative Commons Attribution-Noncommercial-Share Alike (by-nc-sa) license. Under the new license, one can now make derivative works from the book without permission, provided the license and attribution is retained with each new work and the derivatives are not used commercially. Already, fans of the book have begun Russian and Spanish translations, an audio book version, and several amusing re-arrangements of the text. Doctorow has noted that he is pleased that people are building on his work, and that he hopes that further innovations will follow.

Despite these measures, in 2007 invalid DMCA takedown notices were sent by Science Fiction Writers of America (SFWA) with regard to this novel. Cory Doctorow said "Down and Out in the Magic Kingdom was the first novel released under a Creative Commons license, and I've spent the past four years exhorting fans to copy my work and share it. Now I've started to hear from readers who've seen this notice and concluded that I am a hypocrite who uses SFWA to send out legal threats to people who heeded my exhortation."

See also
Adhocracy
Liberty Square
Post scarcity
Postcyberpunk
Subvocal recognition
Transhumanism

References

External links
 The official site for the book on Cory Doctorow's homepage. Includes the full, free text of the book in many downloadable formats.
 

2003 Canadian novels
2003 science fiction novels
Novels by Cory Doctorow
Debut fantasy novels
Transhumanist books
Creative Commons-licensed novels
Postcyberpunk novels
Walt Disney World in fiction
Novels set in the 22nd century
Novels set in Orlando, Florida
Tor Books books
Augmented reality in fiction
Social reputation in fiction
Utopian novels
Smartglasses in fiction
Novels set in amusement parks
2003 debut novels